Joseph Kuhn-Régnier, born Joseph Louis Wilfrid Kuhn-Regnier (10 December 1873 - 1940), was a French illustrator who worked in Paris. His work is recognizable by his characters inspired by Greek and classical art. He contributed full-page colored illustrations and advertisements to society magazines between 1911 and 1934 such as La Vie Parisienne, Fantasio, and Le Sourire.  In 1934 he created colored illustrations for four volume collection The Works of Hippocrates, published by Javal & Bourdeaux in Paris. He also created illustrations for the erotic work The Songs of Bilitis in the 1930s.

1873 births
1940 deaths
French illustrators
French erotic artists